Carlos Ponce is the eponymous debut studio album released by Carlos Ponce. It was produced by Emilio Estefan and Kike Santander. The album was promoted by its lead singles "Rezo" and "Decir Adios", both of which topped the Hot Latin Songs and Latin Pop Airplay charts in the United States. At the 1999 Billboard Latin Music Awards, it won Pop Album by a New Artist and was nominated for Pop Album of the Year by a Male Artist, but lost to Vuelve by Ricky Martin.

Track listing

Charts

Weekly charts

Year-end charts

References

1998 debut albums
Carlos Ponce albums
Spanish-language albums
EMI Latin albums
Albums produced by Emilio Estefan
Albums produced by Kike Santander